Rüti, which comes from the Old High German word , meaning "clearing", is a popular name for towns in the German speaking part of Switzerland. It can refer to the following:

Rüti, Glarus in Glarus
Rüti, Zürich in Zürich
Rüti Reformed Church, an Evangelical Reformed church in the Swiss municipality of Rüti in the Canton of Zürich
Rüti Abbey, a former Premonstratensian abbey, founded in 1206 and suppressed in 1525 on occasion of the Reformation in Zürich, situated in the municipality of Rüti in the canton of Zürich, Switzerland
Rüti bei Büren in Berne
Rüti bei Lyssach in Berne
Rüti bei Riggisberg in Berne
the hamlet of Rüti in the municipality of Hägglingen in Aargau
the hamlet of Rüti in the municipality of Waldkirch SG in St. Gallen
the hamlet of Rüti in the municipality of Affeltrangen in Thurgau
the former municipality of Rüti im Prättigau (St. Antönien Rüti), now part of St. Antönien, Grisons

The names of the following places have the same origin:
the municipality Rüte in Appenzell Innerrhoden
the municipality Rüthi in St. Gallen
the municipality Rüttenen in Solothurn
the mountain Rütli
place names with -rud (Norwegian), -ryd (Swedish) and -rød (Danish)

References